Lisbeli Marina Vera Andrade (born 15 September 2001) is a Venezuelan Paralympic athlete who competes in sprinting events at international elite events. She is a Parapan American Games champion and a double World bronze medalist. Vera Andrade was born without the lower part of her left arm.

References

2001 births
Living people
People from Mérida, Mérida
Paralympic athletes of Venezuela
Venezuelan female sprinters
Medalists at the 2019 Parapan American Games
Medalists at the World Para Athletics Championships
Athletes (track and field) at the 2020 Summer Paralympics
Medalists at the 2020 Summer Paralympics
Paralympic gold medalists for Venezuela
Paralympic medalists in athletics (track and field)
21st-century Venezuelan women